Maryland Route 639 (MD 639) is a state highway in the U.S. state of Maryland.  The state highway runs  from MD 51 in Evitts Creek north to Interstate 68 (I-68), U.S. Route 40 (US 40), US 220, and US 40 Alternate in Cumberland.  MD 639 provides access to Allegany College of Maryland and UPMC Western Maryland hospital, which opened in November 2009.  The Willowbrook Road portion of the state highway was constructed in the late 1960s.  MD 639 was extended south to MD 51 in 2008.

Route description

MD 639 begins at an intersection with MD 51 (Oldtown Road) in Evitts Creek.  The state highway heads north as two-lane Messick Road, paralleling the east side of Evitts Creek.  At the northern end of Messick Road, MD 639 turns onto Williams Road, which continues to follow Evitts Creek.  After crossing the creek, MD 639 turns north onto Willowbrook Road, a two-lane undivided road that passes through two roundabouts at the entrance to the UPMC Western Maryland hospital and then enters the city limits of Cumberland.  After passing the entrance to Allegany College of Maryland, MD 639 turns northwest, passing Country Club Road before reaching its northern terminus at a diamond interchange with I-68, US 40, and US 220 (National Freeway).  The roadway continues as US 40 Alternate (Baltimore Avenue), which heads toward downtown Cumberland.

History
The first section of present-day MD 639 to become a state highway was the Williams Road segment, which was designated part of MD 52 by 1939.  MD 52 was removed from the state highway system in 1956.  Willowbrook Road between I-68 and Country Club Road was improved as a county highway in 1968 concurrent with the completion of the Cumberland Thruway east of downtown Cumberland.  Willowbrook Road was extended on a new alignment south to Williams Road and brought into the state highway system as MD 639 in 1970.  In 2008, MD 639 was extended south along Williams Road and Messick Road to its present southern terminus at MD 51.

Junction list

Auxiliary routes
MD 639A is the designation for the  access road from MD 639 to Allegany College of Maryland, a road that intersects itself twice.
MD 639B is the designation for the  section of Country Club Road between MD 639 and Old Willowbrook Road.

See also

References

External links

639
Maryland Route 639